is a Japanese company. The company is a developer and stockist of graphite material for use in nuclear power, particularly electrical discharge machining electrode, high temperature, and mechanical applications.

The company was founded in 1918 as Tokai Electrode Mfg. Co. Ltd. with a plant in Nagoya and the head office in Tokyo. In 1975 it changed to its present name, Tokai Carbon Co., Ltd. It is listed on the first section of the Tokyo Stock Exchange and is a constituent of the Nikkei 225 stock index.

Company locations

In Japan Tokai Carbon has:
 Manufacturing plants in Ishinomaki, Miyagi, Chigasaki, Kanagawa, Taketoyo, Aichi, Ōmihachiman, Shiga, Hōfu, Yamaguchi, Kitakyushu and Ashikita, Kumamoto
 Laboratories in Oyama, Shizuoka, Taketoyo (Aichi), Hōfu (Yamaguchi), Ashikita (Kumamoto) and Chigasaki (Kanagawa)
 Branch offices in Osaka, Nagoya and Fukuoka
As of the end of 2012 it has 24 subsidiaries and 6 affiliated companies in Japan, Germany, the UK, Sweden, Italy, China, Thailand, South Korea and the US.

Acquisitions
In 2014 the company acquired Cancarb, a Canadian thermal carbon black producer, from TransCanada Corporation.

In June 2018 Tokai announced the acquisition of Sid Richardson Carbon, the largest manufacturer of furnace black in the US. Sid Richardson counts Bridgestone, Michelin, Goodyear and Continental AG among its customers.

Business segments and products
 Carbon black for use in the tire (as a pigment and reinforcing agent for tires) and rubber industry
 Carbon and ceramics
 Graphite electrodes, which are used for recycling steel in electric furnaces
 Fine carbon, which is used in solar cell and semi-conductor industry
 Industrial furnaces and related products for fine ceramic, glass and electronic parts industry
 Other operations
 Friction materials for use in the motorcycle, construction machinery and automobile industries (in brake and clutch systems)
 Property leasing and operation of golf practice centers
Source

References

External links
  
 Tokai Carbon Europe (subsidiary) 
 Tokai ERFTCARBON GmbH (subsidiary) 
 Tokai Carbon USA (subsidiary) 
 Tokai Carbon Korea (joint venture) 
 Tokai Carbon (Tianjin) Co., Ltd. (subsidiary) 

Japanese companies established in 191
Manufacturing companies based in Tokyo
Engineering companies based in Tokyo
Companies listed on the Tokyo Stock Exchange
Manufacturing companies established in 1918
Non-renewable resource companies established in 1918
Nuclear power in Japan
Japanese brands